Kyly Clarke (née Boldy; born 9 August 1981) is an Australian former model.

She was a presenter for The Weather Channel in Australia in 2009. Clarke has a background in modelling and acting since 1999.

Clarke won the Miss Indy 1999, Australian Swimwear Model of the Year 2002, Miss Adrenalin Sports Model of the Year 2003, Miss Hawaiian Island 2003, FHM Miss Snow Bunny 2003 and Miss Manly Warringah Sea Eagles NRL 2003. She also represented Australia overseas in the following competitions:

Miss Australia in Face of Tourism 1999 - Singapore
Miss Australia in Miss Queen of the World 2000 - Germany
Miss Australia in Miss Venus Swimwear Model 2001- USA

In 2004, Clarke trained with the Australian Theatre for Young People in Sydney furthering her skills in acting.

Clarke dated Australian cricket captain Michael Clarke for 18 months before they married on 15 May 2012 in Wolgan Valley Blue Mountains NSW. In 2015 they had their first child. The pair announced their separation in February 2020. 

Clarke was a participant in the fourteenth series of Dancing with the Stars.

References

Australian television presenters
Australian women television presenters
Living people
1981 births